A soul eater is a folklore figure in the traditional belief systems of some African people, notably the Hausa people of Nigeria and Niger.

Belief in soul eaters is related to traditional folk beliefs in witchcraft, zombies, and related phenomena. The soul eater is supposedly able to consume an individual's spirit, causing a wasting disease that can be fatal; "the soul eater is a classical form of the cannibalistic witch". In Hausa belief, the desire and capacity for the practice, termed maita, is rooted in special stones kept in a person's stomach. The trait allegedly can be inherited from one's parents, or can be acquired from an existing practitioner. The soul eater can take the form of a dog or other animal in pursuit of his or her practice—a belief that connects with the beliefs in werewolves, werecats, selkies, and other were-creatures and human/animal beings found in world folklore.

Another belief about soul eaters is that they are men who were cursed by witches and have to eat the souls of humans to live their lives. After the soul eater devours a victim's soul, the victim disappears as dust.

The belief survived into African-American folklore in the United States and the Caribbean region. Related beliefs can be found in other traditional African cultures, like the Fulbe and the Serer, and in cultures outside of Africa too—such as in the tribes of the Mount Hagen area of Papua New Guinea. The hix or ix of the Maya and related peoples is a comparable figure; the Pipil term teyollocuani translates literally as "soul eater".

Some traditional religions, from that of the ancient Egyptians to the Chickasaw, Choctaw, and Natchez, contain figures whose names have been translated into English as "soul eater". The concept also exists in Greek mythology, as demonstrated by the story of Bellerophon who, according to Homer's Iliad, "devour[ed] his own soul." These types of mythological figures, however, are spiritual and not human beings, and so are distinctly different from Hausa and comparable beliefs.

The traditional belief in soul eaters has been adopted by a range of modern horror fiction and fantasy writers, contemporary songwriters, and anime and video game creators.

References

Shapeshifting
Magic (supernatural)
African folklore